Mat Maneri (born October 4, 1969) is an American composer, violin, and viola player. He is the son of the saxophonist Joe Maneri and Sonja Maneri.

Career

Maneri has recorded with Cecil Taylor, Guerino Mazzola, Matthew Shipp, Joe Morris, Gerald Cleaver, Tim Berne, Borah Bergman, Mark Dresser, William Parker, Michael Formanek, John Lockwood, as well as with his own trio, quartet, and quintet. He also played on various band releases such as: Club d'Elf, Decoupage, Brewed by Noon, Paul Motian's Electric Bebop Band, and Buffalo Collision.

Maneri started studying violin at the age of five. He received a full scholarship as the principal violinist at Walnut Hill High School and New England Conservatory of Music, before going on to pursue a professional career in jazz music.

He started releasing records as a leader in 1996 and performed and recorded worldwide. Maneri has worked with Ed Schuller, John Medeski, Roy Campbell, Paul Motian, Robin Williamson, Drew Gress, Tony Malaby, Ben Monder, Barre Phillips, Joëlle Léandre, Marilyn Crispell, Craig Taborn, Ethan Iverson, David King and many others. Maneri also taught privately and at the New School.

Discography

As leader
 In Time with Pandelis Karayorgis (Leo, 1994)
 Three Men Walking (ECM, 1995) with Joe Maneri and Joe Morris
 Out Right Now (hatOLOGY, 1995 [2001]) with Joe Maneri and Joe Morris
 Acceptance (hatOLOGY, 1998)
 Lift & Poise (Leo, 1998) with Pandelis Karayorgis
 Blessed (ECM, 1997) with Mat Maneri
 Fifty-One Sorrows (Leo, 1999)
 So What (Hathut, 1999)
 Blue Decco (Thirsty Ear, 2000)
 Fever Bed (Leo, 2000)
 Light Trigger (No More, 2000)
 Tales of Rohnlief (ECM, 2000)
 Trinity  (ECM, 2001)
 Disambiguation (Leo, 2002)
 For Consequence (Leo, 2003)
 Jam (Hopscotch, 2003)
 Angles of Repose (ECM, 2004)
 Chamber Trio (Leo, 2005)
 Pentagon (Thirsty Ear, 2005)
 The Iron Stone (ECM, 2006)
 Duos (Harmonia Mundi, 2011)
 Metamorphosis (Leo, 2011)
 A Violent Dose of Anything (Leo, 2013)
 Transylvanian Concert (ECM, 2013)
 Two Men Walking (Leo, 2014)
 Breaking Point (Leo, 2016)
 The Art of the Improv Trio, Vol. 2 (Leo, 2016)
 The Bell (ECM, 2016)
 Villa Lobos Suite (Leo, 2016)
 Sounding Tears with Evan Parker & Lucian Ban (Clean Feed, 2017)
 Vessel in Orbit (AUM Fidelity, 2017)

As sideman
With Borah Bergman
 The River of Sounds (Boxholder, 2000)
With Steve Dalachinsky
 Incomplete Directions (Knitting Factory, 1998)
With Kris Davis
 Capricorn Climber (Clean Feed, 2013)
With Heinz Geisser and Guerino Mazzola
 Heliopolis (Cadence, 1999)
 Chronotomy (Blacksaint, 2004)
With Whit Dickey
 Life Cycle (AUM Fidelity, 2001)
 Vessel in Orbit (AUM Fidelity, 2017)
With Ellery Eskelin
 Vanishing Point (hat HUT, 2000)
With Guillermo Gregorio
 Approximately (hat HUT, 1995)
 Red Cube(d) (hat HUT, 1996)
With Masashi Harada
 Obliteration at the End of Multiplication (Leo, 1998)
With Pandelis Karayorgis
 The Other Name (Motive, 1992)
With Russ Lossing
 Metal Rat (Clean Feed, 2000)
With Joe Maneri
 Kalavinka (Cochlea, 1989)
 Get Ready to Receive Yourself (Leo, 1993)
 Tenderly (hatOLOGY, 1993 [1999])
 Dahabenzapple (hat ART, 1993 [1996])
 Coming Down the Mountain (hatOLOGY, 1993 [1997])
 Let the Horse Go (Leo, 1995)
 Three Men Walking with Joe Morris (ECM, 1995)
 Out Right Now with Joe Morris (hatOLOGY, 1996)
 In Full Cry (ECM, 1996)
 Blessed (ECM, 1997)
 The Trio Concerts (Leo, 1997)
 Tales of Rohnlief (ECM, 1998)
 Going to Church (AUM Fidelity, 2002)
With Joe Morris
 You Be Me (Soul Note, 1997)
 A Cloud of Black Birds (AUM Fidelity, 1998)
 Underthru (OmniTone, 1999)
 Soul Search (AUM Fidelity, 1999)
 At the Old Office (Knitting Factory, 2000)
 Balance (Clean Feed, 2014)
With Ivo Perelman
 A Violent Dose of Anything (Leo, 2013)
 Counterpoint (Leo, 2015)
 Breaking Point (Leo, 2016)
With Matthew Shipp
 Critical Mass (2.13.61, 1995)
 The Flow of X (2.13.61, 1997)
 By the Law of Music (hat HUT, 1997)
 Gravitational Systems (hatOLOGY, 2000)
 Expansion, Power, Release (hatOLOGY, 2001)
 The Gospel According to Matthew & Michael (Relative Pitch, 2015)
With Spring Heel Jack
 Masses (Thirsty Ear, 2001)
With Stone Quartet (Joëlle Léandre, Roy Campbell, Marilyn Crispell, Maneri
 Live at Vision Festival (Ayler, 2011)
With Craig Taborn
 Junk Magic (Thirsty Ear Recordings, 2004)
With Cecil Taylor
 Algonquin (Bridge, 1999)
With David S. Ware
 Threads (Thirsty Ear, 2003)
With Keith Yaun
 Countersink (Leo, 1998)
 Amen: Improvisations on Messiaen (Boxholder, 1999)
With Ches Smith
 The Bell (ECM, 2016)
With Lucian Ban
 Enesco Re-imagined (Sunnyside, 2010)
 Elevation (Sunnyside, 2016)

References

External links
 Maneri's MySpace page

Avant-garde jazz musicians
1969 births
Living people
American people of Italian descent
Musicians from Brooklyn
American jazz violinists
American male violinists
American jazz violists
Jazz musicians from New York (state)
21st-century American violinists
21st-century American male musicians
American male jazz musicians
ECM Records artists
Thirsty Ear Recordings artists
Leo Records artists
Clean Feed Records artists
AUM Fidelity artists
21st-century violists